Mark Andrew Hagemoen (born September 4, 1961) is a Canadian Roman Catholic bishop.

Ordained to the priesthood on May 12, 1990, Hagemoen was named bishop of the Roman Catholic Diocese of Mackenzie–Fort Smith, Canada on October 15, 2013.

Born and raised in Vancouver, British Columbia. He graduated in 1979 from Vancouver College, a Catholic boys' school. After completing his undergraduate degree (Bachelor of Arts) at the University of British Columbia, and a year of travel throughout Southeast Asia, the Middle East, and Europe, he worked in mineral exploration, mainly in British Columbia. Hagemoen entered St. Peter's Seminary in London, Ont., completing his Masters of Divinity degree.  He was ordained in Vancouver by Bishop Lawrence Sabatini in May 1990.  He completed the National Certificate in Youth Ministry Studies and the Diploma for Advanced Studies in Ministry in 1997. He earned a Doctor of Ministry program at Trinity Western University, which he completed in 2007.

From 2002 - 2011 he served as Parish Priest at St. John the Apostle Parish in the Kerrisdale neighbourhood of Vancouver.

In 2011, Hagemoen was elected President of Corpus Christi College and Principal of St. Mark's College for a five-year term. Corpus Christi, the liberal arts college, and Saint Mark's College, the graduate theological college affiliated with the University of British Columbia (UBC), are both located on the Vancouver campus of the university. An avid hiker and runner, Hagemoen will be the ninth bishop appointed to the diocese since Vital Grandin was given the post in 1861.

On September 12, 2017, Pope Francis appointed Hagemoen as Bishop of the Saskatoon Diocese. It was later announced that he will be officially installed as Bishop on November 23, 2017.

References

1961 births
Living people
People from Vancouver
21st-century Roman Catholic bishops in Canada
University of British Columbia alumni
St. Peter's Seminary (Diocese of London, Ontario) alumni
Roman Catholic bishops of Mackenzie–Fort Smith
Roman Catholic bishops of Saskatoon